¿Quién es el señor López? (Spanish for "Who is Mr. Lopez?")  is a 2006 film made by film director Luis Mandoki. It is a political non-fiction film about the  2006 and  2012 Mexican presidential candidate Andrés Manuel López Obrador and the 2006 Mexican general election.

The five-DVD documentary includes interviews with López Obrador and with journalists and academics, including Denise Dresser (ITAM), Lorenzo Meyer (COLMEX); the lawyers Néstor de Buen, Javier Quijano and Juventino Castro y Castro, all of them sympathizers with the Revolutionary Democratic Party of the candidate.

The film author has given his work a copyleft licence. It can be distributed at no cost.

References

External links
 

2006 films
Documentary films about politics
2000s Spanish-language films
Mexican documentary films
2006 documentary films
Andrés Manuel López Obrador
2000s Mexican films